Scopula alba is a moth of the family Geometridae. It is found in France, Italy and on Sicily and Corsica.

Subspecies
Scopula alba alba
Scopula alba africana (Hausmann, 1993)
Scopula alba brunellii (Hausmann, 1993)
Scopula alba capriata (Hausmann, 1993)
Scopula alba milleri Hausmann, 2004 (Corsica)

References

External links
Lepiforum.de

Moths described in 1993
alba
Moths of Europe